Vodnik is an urban-type settlement of Xoʻjayli District in Karakalpakstan in Uzbekistan. Its population was 5,176 people in 1989, and 5,900 in 2016.

References

Populated places in Karakalpakstan
Urban-type settlements in Uzbekistan